Im Kyu-tae and Danai Udomchoke were the defending champions but Im decided not to participate.
Udomchoke played alongside Daniel Garza, but they lost in the quarterfinals to Raven Klaasen and Izak van der Merwe.
Yuki Bhambri and Divij Sharan won the title defeating Hsieh Cheng-peng and Lee Hsin-han in the final 1–6, 6–1, [10–5].

Seeds

Draw

Draw

References
 Main Draw

Busan Open Challenger Tennis - Doubles
2012 Doubles